Bergen-Lafayette
Beacon
Bergen Hill
Communipaw
The Junction
Jackson HIll
The Heights
Chelsea
Sparrow Hill
Washington Village, around Palisade Avenue
Western Slope
Historic Downtown
Grove Street
Hamilton Park
Harsimus
Boyle Plaza
Van Vorst Park
The Village
West End (historic)
Hudson Waterfront
Exchange Place
Harborside Financial Center
Newport
Paulus Hook
Powerhouse Arts District, formerly known as "WALDO"
Greenville
Curries Woods
Port Liberte
Country Village
Claremont
Journal Square
Bergen Square
Five Corners
The Hilltop
India Square
The Island
Marion
McGinley Square
West Side
Hackensack Riverfront
Country Village
Croxton
Droyer's Point
Lincoln Park/West Bergen
Riverbend
Society Hill

See also
Historic Districts in Hudson County, New Jersey
List of neighborhoods of Hudson County, New Jersey
Neighboring towns in Hudson County:
Bayonne
North Hudson
North Bergen
Weehawken
Hoboken
Union City
West New York
Guttenberg
Secaucus
West Hudson

References
 

Neighborhoods in Jersey City, New Jersey
Neighborhoods in Hudson County, New Jersey